Dyjákovice is a municipality and village in Znojmo District in the South Moravian Region of the Czech Republic. It has about 800 inhabitants.

History
The first written mention of Dyjákovice is from 1278.

Demographics

References

External links

Villages in Znojmo District